The King of Whys is the ninth studio album by Chicago musician Mike Kinsella under the moniker Owen. Announced on May 25, 2016, the record was released on July 29, 2016. The album was recorded at April Base Studios in Eau Claire, WI. The first single, "Lost", was released via NPR on May 25, 2016. Kinsella collaborated with S. Carey who produced the album during two nine-day sessions.

Critical reception

Writing for Exclaim!, Adam Feibel called it "wrought with restless artistry". Consequence of Sound described it as "A lush, affecting album that probes life’s complexities only to arrive at more questions".

Track listing
All songs written by Mike Kinsella

References

2016 albums
Owen (musician) albums
Polyvinyl Record Co. albums